Caprina is a genus of rudists, a group of marine heterodont bivalves belonging to the family Caprinidae.

These stationary intermediate-level epifaunal suspension feeders lived in the Cretaceous period, from 140.2 to 70.6 Ma. The rudists became extinct at the end of the Cretaceous, apparently as a result of the Cretaceous–Paleogene extinction event.

Fossils of this genus have been found in the sediments of Europe, Japan, Cuba, Mexico and the United States.

References

Cretaceous bivalves
Hippuritida
Prehistoric bivalve genera
Early Cretaceous genus first appearances
Albian genera
Cenomanian genera
Late Cretaceous genus extinctions